Tom Marshall  is a British actor playing in the National Theatre, West End theatre, Royal Court Theatre, and Menier Chocolate Factory.
In July 2016 he was nominated for an Offie Award for It Is Easy To Be Dead.

His film credits include roles in There's a Girl in My Soup (1970), Revenge (1971) and the cult horror film Killer's Moon (1978). In 1974, Marshall appeared as William in an episode of Upstairs, Downstairs entitled "I Dies from Love".

References

External links
 

British male film actors
British male television actors
Year of birth missing (living people)
Living people